Fanleaf can mean:

 Psathyrotes, a genus of North American desert plants
 Fanleaf virus, a grape virus
 Fioria, a genus of plants in the family Malvaceae